The 2020–21 Cypriot First Division was the 82nd season of the Cypriot top-level football league.

Stadiums and locations 

Note: Table lists clubs in alphabetical order.

Personnel and kits 
Note: Flags indicate national team as has been defined under FIFA eligibility rules. Players and Managers may hold more than one non-FIFA nationality.

Regular season

League table

Results

Positions by Round
The table lists the positions of teams after each week of matches. In order to preserve chronological progress, any postponed matches are not included in the round at which they were originally scheduled, but added to the full round they were played immediately afterwards. For example, if a match is scheduled for round 13, but then postponed and played between rounds 16 and 17, it will be added to the standings for round 16.

Championship round

Championship round table

Positions by Round

Relegation round

Relegation round table

Positions by Round
The table lists the positions of teams after each week of matches. In order to preserve chronological progress, any postponed matches are not included in the round at which they were originally scheduled, but added to the full round they were played immediately afterwards. For example, if a match is scheduled for round 3, but then postponed and played between rounds 6 and 7, it will be added to the standings for round 6.

Season statistics

Top scorers

References

Cypriot First Division seasons
Cyprus
2020–21 in Cypriot football